Fermin Galeano Gaekel (born November 7, 1975), is a Honduran actor who has appeared in leading roles in several films.  Throughout his career, he has earned recognition in Iceland, the United States, Honduras and England for his acting.

Fermin Galeano is an actor and director, known for Beyond the Tree (2014), Sushi (2013), Her letters (2013), Mic and El Xendra (2012), Semper Fidel (2011), The locksmith and Fairlawn (2010)

References

Living people
1975 births
Honduran male actors